Abū Rifāʿa ʿUmāra ibn Wathīma ibn Mūsā ibn al-Furāt al-Fārisī (died 4 June 902) was a Muslim historian from Egypt. Born in Fusṭāṭ, he was a son of the historian and silk trader Wathīma ibn Mūsā, a native of Fasā in Persia. The year of his birth is unknown, but his father died in 851. He wrote at least two works in Arabic.

ʿUmāra's only surviving work is the oldest surviving book of the qiṣaṣ al-anbiyāʾ genre, entitled Kitāb badʾ al-khalq wa-qiṣaṣ al-anbiyāʾ ('Book of the Beginnings of Creation and the Stories of the Prophets'). It is the earliest source to cite the enigmatic Abū al-Ḥasan al-Bakrī. It was itself never widely cited. Of its original two volumes, only the second survives in two manuscripts. It has been argued that the real author of the Badʾ al-khalq is Wathīma, who was much more prominent than his son.

According to Ibn al-Jawzī, ʿUmāra also wrote an Annalistic History.

Notes

Bibliography

9th-century births
902 deaths
9th-century historians from the Abbasid Caliphate
9th-century Arabic writers
Writers from Cairo